Artistically Beatles is a studio album by keyboardist Vince DiCola. DiCola covers ten Beatles songs that he arranged in a New-age instrumental genre. It was released in 1993 and features Roger Voudouris on lead vocals on the first track. On the bottom, front cover of the artwork it reads, "New Contemporary Instrumental Arrangements."

Track listing
All Songs are performed, arranged and produced by Vincent DiCola

Personnel
 Vince DiCola - keyboards, synthesizer, engineer
 Owen Husney - Executive Producer
 Jim Dryden - Cover Illustration
 Roger Voudouris - Vocals on 1st track

References

New-age albums by American artists
Vince DiCola albums
1993 albums
The Beatles tribute albums